is a Japanese football player who can play as a forward, currently playing for J2 League club Fagiano Okayama.

Club career

Cerezo Osaka
During the 2011/12 season, Nagai made his AFC Champions League debut as a 74th-minute substitute for Cerezo Osaka against Chinese club Shandong Luneng on 10 May 2011. Cerezo Osaka won the group G match 4–0 at the Nagai Stadium, Osaka, Japan.

Perth Glory
On 28 September 2012 it was announced that Nagai had signed with Perth Glory for a season long loan deal. He played his first game for Perth Glory coming of the bench in the team's 1–0 loss to the Central Coast Mariners.

During his first season with the Glory, Ryo found it hard to break into the starting team under then coach Ian Ferguson. His playing time was greatly restricted until Ferguson stood down in February and Perth Glory appointed Alistair Edwards as his replacement. Under Edwards, Nagai flourished and his performances improved with each game played and Nagai contributed to Glory's surprise push for the A-League finals.

On 5 July 2013 it was announced that Perth Glory and Cerezo Osaka had finally agreed to a new loan deal for Ryo to spend the 2013/14 A-League season with the Western Australian club. Upon the announcement of the signing, Perth Glory head coach, Alistair Edwards, told the media that Ryo had become one of the family and highlighted his versatility in attack as one of the major reasons Glory were keen to secure his signature for a second time.

On 11 January 2014 Perth Glory and Nagai parted company with the Western Australian club terminating the speedy winger's loan contract. Nagai was unable to participate in the remainder of the A-League season after suffering a serious hamstring tear in Perth's round 11 0–0 draw with Adelaide United. It was mutually agreed that Nagai would be best served in his recovery by returning to Japan to parent club Cerezo Osaka. Perth Glory CEO, Jason Brewer, praised Nagai for being a fantastic player, citing Ryo's attacking flair on his departure from the club as the main reason why in just two years Nagai had become a firm fan favourite. Nagai responded to his departure from the club in an equally positive fashion, stating "I have met some great people here and I will take all the positive experiences I have learnt at Perth back to Japan with me".

On 26 December 2016, Nagai signed for Nagoya Grampus.

International career

Ryo Nagai has previously represented and captained Japan at U-19 level.

Career statistics

Club
.

References

External links
Profile at Matsumoto Yamaga 
Profile at Nagoya Grampus

Profile at Cerezo Osaka
Perth Glory profile 

1991 births
Living people
Association football people from Hyōgo Prefecture
Japanese footballers
J1 League players
J2 League players
A-League Men players
Cerezo Osaka players
Perth Glory FC players
Oita Trinita players
V-Varen Nagasaki players
Nagoya Grampus players
Matsumoto Yamaga FC players
Sanfrecce Hiroshima players
Fagiano Okayama players
Expatriate soccer players in Australia
Japanese expatriate sportspeople in Australia
Association football forwards